Rock Island Bridge may refer to:

 Rock Island Bridge (Kansas City, Kansas), over the Kansas River in Kansas City, Kansas and Missouri
 Rock Island Centennial Bridge, connecting Rock Island, Illinois and Davenport, Iowa over the Mississippi River

 Government Bridge, current railroad swing bridge joining Rock Island, Illinois with Davenport, Iowa, location of the first Mississippi river railroad bridge named "Rock Island Bridge"

 Rock Island Railroad Bridge (disambiguation), numerous railroad bridges with the name "Rock Island"

See also
 Rock Island (disambiguation)